Tengkhat College, established in 1967, is a major and general degree college situated at Tengakhat, Assam. This college is affiliated with the Dibrugarh University.

Departments

Arts
Assamese
English
History
Education
Economics
Philosophy
Political Science
Sociology

References

External links
https://tengakhatcollege.edu.in/

Universities and colleges in Assam
Colleges affiliated to Dibrugarh University
Educational institutions established in 1967
1967 establishments in Assam